A deadly and destructive outbreak sequence of 23 tornadoes struck parts of the Great Plains and the Great Lakes in late-June 1957. At least seven significant tornadoes (F2+) touched down during the outbreak sequence. The most devastating storm was a large, violent, and catastrophic 500-yard-wide F5 tornado family that struck Fargo, North Dakota on Thursday, June 20, 1957, killing 10 people and becoming the deadliest tornado ever recorded in North Dakota. The outbreak caused 11 fatalities, 105 injuries, and $25.883 million in damage.

Meteorological Synopsis
On June 20, 1957, a combination of strong instability and vertical wind shear, high storm-relative helicity (SRH), favorable storm-relative flow (SRF), and lowered lifted condensation levels (LCLs) set up over the High Plains. Boundary-layer moisture was also present, which was enhanced via evapotranspiration (ET) and moisture convergence. A shortwave ridge then centered itself over the region and, despite only modest forcing, a trough spawned a low-pressure area over Southwestern North Dakota. It then moved northeastward into the central part of the state, where temperatures and dewpoints were in the lower 80s and lower 70s respectfully. Although bulk shear was not quite high enough to support long-tracked supercells, meteorologist did indicate that an outbreak of severe thunderstorms along with a significant to violent tornado or two was possible.

That afternoon, a thunderstorm complex over Devil's Lake, North Dakota produced an outflow boundary that further enhanced the low-level convergence zone in Eastern North Dakota and Western Minnesota. An isolated supercell formed in the warm sector of the low pressure system and took advantage of this favorable environment, dropping five tornadoes, including the F5 tornado in Fargo (although the tornado family has been listed as one tornado). Four other tornadoes were confirmed on that day, although most were brief, but some were strong as well.

Confirmed tornadoes

June 20 event

June 21 event

June 22 event

June 23 event

Wheatland—Fargo, North Dakota/Moorhead–Hawley, Minnesota

A violent F5 tornado family tore directly through Downtown Fargo, killing 10 and injuring 103. The supercell produced the first tornado at 5:40 pm CDT near Wheatland, North Dakota. The weak F0 tornado moved east-northeast, tossing haybales and damaging crops. After , the tornado lifted and another tornado touched down just to its south. It struck the town of Casselton at F2 intensity, causing major damage. After traveling  the tornado lifted and supercell continued to the east for about  without producing a tornado, although a consistent wall cloud was present.

As it neared Fargo, the cell dropped another tornado over West Fargo. Numerous homes, businesses, and vehicles were damaged and destroyed. One neighborhood had multiple homes that were completely swept away and all 10 fatalities occurred here. Damage at this location was rated F5. The tornado then weakened, but remained strong as it crossed the Red River into Moorhead, Minnesota, damaging more buildings and homes. After continuing another , the supercell dropped a fourth tornado, which quickly became a violent F4 storm as it moved eastward through Glyndon. It then turned northeastward, and produced significant tree damage along the Buffalo River before completely destroying a family farm. Significant damage was observed on a second farm before the tornado abruptly turned north and dissipated after traveling . A clock inside the residence stopped at 9:05 pm CDT, when the tornado struck. The tornado dissipated five minutes later at 9:10 pm CDT.

Although numerous studies indicate that this was a tornado family, it is officially listed as one continuous tornado. A total of 10 people were killed (some sources list the death toll as 12) and 103 others were injured with all the casualties occurring in Fargo, making it the deadliest tornado ever recorded in North Dakota. Damage was estimated $25.25 million (1957 USD).

Non-tornadic impacts
Along with tornadoes, numerous reports of strong winds and large hail occurred during the period. June 20 saw baseball-sized hail south of Valley City in Barnes County, North Dakota. Later, a  wind gust was recorded just southeast of Ruskin Park, South Dakota. The next day, a  wind gust was recorded just northwest of Castleton, Kansas. The next day, a massive  hailstone was documented northeast of Fort Stockton, Texas, the largest from the event.

See also
List of F5 and EF5 tornadoes
List of tornadoes and tornado outbreaks
List of North American tornadoes and tornado outbreaks

Notes

References

Tornadoes of 1957
F5 tornadoes
Tornadoes in North Dakota
Tornadoes in South Dakota
Tornadoes in Minnesota
Tornadoes in Michigan
Tornadoes in Nebraska
Tornadoes in Colorado
Tornadoes in Kansas
Tornadoes in Missouri
Tornadoes in Texas